Íslandsflug was an airline and aircraft leasing company based at Keflavík International Airport, Reykjavík.

History
The airline was established in 1991 by the merger of two small domestic scheduled airlines, Arnarflug innanlands hf. and Flugtak.  In 1994, the airline began overnight parcel services to East Midlands Airport using a Fairchild Metro aircraft.  The airline took delivery of its first ATR-42 in 1996.  In 1997, the airline became a jet operator with the delivery of its first Boeing 737-200QC which was used for passenger and freight services.  

Islandsflug's first widebody aircraft, an Airbus A310, was delivered in 2001, making the airline the first Airbus operator in Iceland.

In 2005 it merged into Air Atlanta Icelandic. Landsflug took over the domestic operations of Islandsflug.

Fleet
 

Íslandsflug operated the following aircraft:

 9 Boeing 737-300
 6 Boeing 737-400
 6 Airbus A300
 4 Dornier 228
 3 Airbus A310
 3 ATR 42
 3 Beech 99
 2 Boeing 737-200
 1 Dornier 328
 1 Swearingen Merlin

Accidents and incidents 
 On 23 June 2004 a Dornier 228 registered TF-ELH belly landed at Sigluförður Airport, due to pilot error. The only people aboard were the 2 pilots, who escaped unharmed.

References

External links

Defunct airlines of Iceland
Airlines established in 1991
Airlines disestablished in 2004
1991 establishments in Iceland